Strnišče is a small settlement south of Kidričevo in northeastern Slovenia. It is the western part of the settlement of the same name that became Kidričevo after the Second World War. The area is part of the traditional region of Styria. It is now included with the rest of the Municipality of Kidričevo in the Drava Statistical Region.

References

External links
Strnišče on Geopedia

Populated places in the Municipality of Kidričevo